Alison Appleton (born Liverpool 1965) is a British ceramic designer specializing in porcelain teaware. The collections are influenced by a range of sources including eighteenth-century chinoiserie to fairy tales, using specialist clays and glazes to create different textures and finishes. She works from her design studio in the Baltic Triangle, Liverpool.

Background 
Appleton has a degree in printed textile design from Liverpool College of Art and established her studio in 1998. Her work went on to retail in Marks & Spencer, John Lewis, Debenhams, Zara Home, Crate & Barrel, Anthropologie and others. She also worked with La Cafetiere, a British tea and coffee ware company, based in North Wales, where she designed a range of products, including the Lexi cafetiere and California teapots.

Appleton has been retailing her collection of tea pots, tea cups, tea towels and specialty teas under her own brand since 2012. She partnered with the home of Blanc de Chine porcelain. Mr Liu, an expert ceramicist in Dehua in China.

In 2013 she was awarded Woman of the Year for her work in establishing international trade.  She gave tea-making demonstrations at the Cake and Bake Show in Manchester in 2014.

The blenders at English tea importer and retailer Twinings partnered with Alison Appleton for Single Origin tea blend. In November 2014, Appleton was appointed an Export Champion by UK Trade and Investment, and worked with the Government trade body to support British companies.

Products 
Appleton says that the practicalities of making a really good cup of tea are the key to her design philosophy.  Her stated view is: "A good cup of tea should be something to take time over and savour. Good tea and tea ware should be a gift, either to oneself or to others."   She once told an audience at the Women in Business awards that a lady's teapot should always match her dress.

The Darcy tea set is inspired by the Regency fashion for chinoiserie and a time when drinking afternoon tea was an important social occasion. Its teapot was featured in the Independent's Ten Best Teapots in July 2013. The Golden Carp set takes its inspiration from the carp and lotus flower, Chinese symbols of good fortune and purity. The two are featured as a relief design under a celadon glaze. The Camellia teapot is inspired by the flowers of Camellia Sinensis, the plant from China which gives us tea, and the Woodland collection is evocative of fairy-tale forests. Her view is that: "Every day should include a tea ceremony. Life's too short for ugly mugs and dusty teabags," has resulted in all her teapots including stainless steel fine-mesh filters, so they can be used with fine and long leafed teas.

Her products can be seen in shops and online retailers including Harrods, Whittards, Twinings, the British Museum and Not on the High Street. They have also been featured in British newspapers such as the Sunday Express, Sunday Times  and Yorkshire Post;  and in magazines including Ideal Home, Good Homes, Bella, Shortlist, The English Home, House Beautiful, Beautiful Kitchens and Period Ideas.

References

Further reading 
 Achica Living, May 2013: Make Yourself at Home with Aged-effect Homewares
 Burgess, Lloyd, Period Ideas, October 2013 At Home with Alison Appleton
 McDonagh, Tony, Liverpool Daily Post, 12 December 2013 Women in Business: Alison Appleton, founder of Alison Appleton Ltd
 Nicholls, Mark, Twinings Tea, 16 January 2014 Introducing Alison: a conversation with Mark NIcholls
 Leonard, Damian, Your Move magazine 356: 31 January 2014  Cup Winner
 Benedetti, Ginevra, Ideal Home, February 2014 High Street Heroes: Alison Appleton
 Curtis, Amy, Good Homes magazine, February 2014 At Home
 Ireland's Homes Interiors & Living magazine, March 2014 Designer Profile

External links 
 
 Alison Appleton at La Cafetiere
 The Cake and Bake Show, Manchester
 Alison Appleton's collections at Twinings Tea
 Alison Appleton at Not On the High Street
 Alison Appleton at the British Museum Online Shop

1965 births
Alumni of Liverpool College of Art
British ceramicists
British women ceramicists
Living people